The 2010 BWF World Championships was the 18th tournament of the World Badminton Championships. It was held at Stade Pierre de Coubertin in Paris, France, from August 23 to August 29, 2010. Following the results of the women's doubles.

Seeds

 Ma Jin / Wang Xiaoli (finalists)
 Du Jing / Yu Yang (champions)
 Cheng Wen-hsing / Chien Yu-chin (semifinals)
 Cheng Shu / Zhao Yunlei (semifinals)
 Miyuki Maeda / Satoko Suetsuna (quarterfinals)
 Ha Jung-eun / Kim Min-jung (quarterfinals)
 Pan Pan / Tian Qing (quarterfinals)
 Yoo Hyun-young / Jung Kyung-eun (quarterfinals)
 Mizuki Fujii / Reika Kakiiwa (second round, retired)
 Petya Nedelcheva /  Anastasia Russkikh (third round)
 Shinta Mulia Sari / Yao Lei (third round)
 Valeria Sorokina / Nina Vislova (third round)
 Savitree Amitrapai / Vacharaporn Munkit (first round)
 Duanganong Aroonkesorn / Kunchala Voravichitchaikul (third round)
 Shizuka Matsuo / Mami Naito (third round)
 Jwala Gutta / Ashwini Ponnappa (third round)

Main stage

Section 1

Section 2

Section 3

Section 4

Final stage

External links
Official website
tournamentsoftware.com

2010 BWF World Championships
BWF